Tomás Helmut Straka Medina (born October 25, 1972), is a Venezuelan author and professor of history at the Andrés Bello Catholic University,

Career 
Straka is the author of La Voz de los Vencidos (2000), Hechos y gente, Historia contemporánea de Venezuela (2001), Un Reino para este mundo (2006), La épica del desencanto (2009), La república fragmentada. Claves para entender a Venezuela (2015), among other works and essays. 

Outside of his work at  Andrés Bello Catholic University in Venezuela, Straka has been a visiting scholar at the University of Chicago, Universidad Nacional Autónoma de México and Pomona College. Since 2016, he has been a member of the National Academy of History (Venezuela).

Personal life and education 
Straka is the son of Austrian anthropologist Hellmuth Straka (1922–1987) and brother of human rights activist Ursula Straka.

He holds a PhD in History (Doctor en Historia) from Andrés Bello Catholic University. Additionally, he holds degrees from Instituto Pedagógico de Caracas and Universidad Central de Venezuela.

Bibliography 
 La voz de los vencidos, ideas del partido realista de Caracas (1810–1821), 2000.
 Hechos y gente, Historia contemporánea de Venezuela (Textbook about Venezuelan contemporary history), 2001.
 La alas de Ícaro, indagación sobre ética y ciudadanía en Venezuela (1800–1830)", 2005.
 Un reino para este mundo, Catolicismo y republicanismo en Venezuela, 2006.
 La Tradición de lo moderno, Venezuela en diez enfoques (Editor) 2006.
 Biographies of Julián Castro and Juan Crisóstomo Falcón for the "Biblioteca Biográfica Venezolana" of El Nacional, 2006–2007.
 Contra Bolívar (Compilation and comments about a series of articles of royalist journalist José Domingo Díaz against Simón Bolívar), 2009.
 La épica del desencanto (Analysis of Simón Bolívar as cult figure in Venezuelan politics, society and history), 2009.
 Instauración de la República Liberal Autocrática: claves para su interpretación 1830–1899 (Venezuela's panorama during the second half of 19th century), 2010.
 Historia de la Iglesia Católica en Venezuela. Documentos para su estudio. Along with historian Manuel Donís (Compilation of important documents of Venezuelan Catholic Church), 2010.
 Las Independencias de Iberoamérica (Editor with Agustín Sánchez Andrés and Michael Zeuske), 2011.
 Venezuela 1861–1936. La era de los gendarmes. Caudillismo y liberalismo autocrático, 2013.
 La república fragmentada. Claves para entender a Venezuela, 2015.
 Historical Dictionary of Venezuela (with Guillermo Guzmán Mirabal and Alejandro Cáceres), 2018.he just djmbn
 La economía venezolana en el siglo XX.  Perspectiva sectorial (Editor with Fernando Spiritto), 2018

References 
https://nuso.org/autor/tomas-straka/
https://tinker.org/tomas-straka/
https://harris.uchicago.edu/directory/tomas-straka
https://www.linkedin.com/in/tom%C3%A1s-straka-36573a90/

1972 births
Living people
Writers from Caracas
Venezuelan male writers
21st-century Venezuelan historians
Academic staff of Simón Bolívar University (Venezuela)
Andrés Bello Catholic University alumni
Pomona College faculty